McCouch is a surname. Notable people with the surname include:

Grayson McCouch (born 1968), American actor
Susan McCouch (born 1953), American geneticist

English-language surnames